The 2017–18 Argentine Primera B Nacional is the 33rd season of the Argentine second division. The season began in September 2017 and ended in June 2018. Twenty-five teams competed in the league, seventeen returning from the 2016–17 season, four teams that were relegated from Primera División and two teams promoted from Federal A and B Metropolitana.

Competition format
The league's format changed from the previous season. Twenty-five teams play each other once for a total of twenty-four matches each. The Champion earns promotion to the Primera División. The teams placed 2nd to 9th compete in the "Torneo Reducido" for the second promotion after the regular season ends. Six teams are relegated at the end of the season.

Club information

League table

Championship play-off 

Almagro and Aldosivi ended up tied in points at the end of the 24 weeks of regular season. Tournament rules establish that, unlike any other position on the table, if two or more teams are equal in points at the end of play, goal difference does not count and a playoff game is required. The winner of this match will achieve Promotion to Primera División as champions, while the loser will qualify to Torneo Reducido as runners-up.

Results

Torneo Reducido

Teams ending in positions 2 to 9 play the Torneo Reducido for a second Promotion to Primera División. Quarterfinals are played in one leg, at the stadium of the best placed team. In case of a tie, the best placed team advances. Semi-finals are played on two legs, and in case of a tie the best placed team advances. The finals are played on two legs, and a penalty shootout will occur in case of a tie.

Relegation
The bottom six teams of this table were relegated. In the Primera B Nacional, clubs with an indirect affiliation with Argentine Football Association are relegated to the Torneo Federal A, while clubs directly affiliated are relegated to Primera B Metropolitana.

Source: AFA

Season statistics

Top scorers

See also
 2017–18 Argentine Primera División
 2017–18 Torneo Federal A
 2017–18 Copa Argentina

Note

References

External links
 soccerway.com

Primera B Nacional seasons
2017–18 in Argentine football leagues